Edward Legge may refer to:

Edward Legge (Royal Navy officer) (1710–1747), Royal Navy officer and posthumous MP for Portsmouth
Edward Legge (bishop) (1767–1827), Bishop of Oxford, clergyman